Parenica is a traditional Slovak cheese. Parenica is a semi-firm, non-ripening, semi-fat, steamed and usually smoked cheese, although a non-smoked version is also produced. Parenica is cream and yellow in color, which is darkened by steaming. The cheese is produced in strips, which are woven into snail-like spirals.  Originally, about two centuries ago, it was made from pure non-pasteurized sheep's milk.  Modern varieties are also produced from cow's milk or milk mixtures.  Typical cheese rolls weigh about 100 grams (0.1 kg / 0.2 pound / 3 oz).

The name comes from the Slovak word for steaming. Slovenská parenica is a protected trade name under the EU's protected geographical indication.

See also
 List of smoked foods
 List of cheeses
 List of stretch-cured cheeses

References

External links
 Production of Parenica (scroll down to "Steamed cheese")

Cheeses
Slovak cheeses
Smoked cheeses
Stretched-curd cheeses